The 1964–65 Hellenic Football League season was the 12th in the history of the Hellenic Football League, a football competition in England.

Premier Division

The Premier Division featured 16 clubs which competed in the division last season, along with two new clubs, promoted from Division One:
Henley Town
Kidlington

Also, Yiewsley reserves changed name to Hillingdon Borough reserves.

League table

Division One

The Division One featured 7 clubs which competed in the division last season, along with 9 new club:
Stokenchurch, relegated from the Premier Division
Wantage Town, relegated from the Premier Division
Waddesdon
Dunstable Town reserves, joined from the United Counties League
Aylesbury Town Corinthians
Watlington
Smith’s Industries (Witney)
Rivet Works (Aylesbury)
Oxford Co-Op Sports

League table

References

External links
 Hellenic Football League

1964-65
H